Mohammad Bagheri may refer to:
 Mohammad Bagheri Motamed
 Mohammad Bagheri (politician)
Chel Mohammad-e Baqeri Pereshkaft
 Mohammad Bagheri (Iranian commander)